The 3rd Kisei was the 3rd edition of the Kisei tournament. Since Fujisawa Hideyuki won the previous year, he was given an automatic place in the final. Eight players battled in a knockout tournament to decide the final 2. Those two would then play each other in a best-of-3 match to decide who would face Fujisawa. Ishida Yoshio became the challenger after beating Sakata Eio 2 games to 1, but would lose 4 games to 1 against Fujisawa.

Main tournament

Challenger finals

Finals

References 

Kisei (Go)
1979 in go